The year 2015 was the 23rd year in the history of the Ultimate Fighting Championship (UFC), a mixed martial arts promotion based in the United States.

Title fights

The Ultimate Fighter
The following The Ultimate Fighter seasons are scheduled for broadcast in 2015:

Debut UFC fighters

The following fighters fought their first UFC fight in 2015:

Abner Lloveras
Alex Olivera
Alex Torres
Aleksandra Albu
Alvaro Herrera
Andrew Holbrook
Anthony Christodoulou
Anton Zafir
Arnold Allen
Artem Lobov
Bartosz Fabinski
Ben Nguyen
Bentley Syler
Bruno Rodrigues
Cesar Arzamendia
Chris de la Rocha
Chris Gruetzemacher
Cody Garbrandt
Cody Pfister
Cortney Casey
Damian Stasiak
Daniel Jolly
Danny Roberts
Darren Till
Dileno Lopes
Dominic Waters
Dong Hyun Kim
Dominique Steele
Elizeu Zaleski dos Santos
Enrique Barzola
Erick Montaño
Ericka Almeida
Fernando Bruno

Frankie Perez
Francis Ngannou
Fredy Serrano
Garreth McLellan
Geane Herrera
Glaico França
Hayder Hassan
Horacio Gutiérrez
Holly Holm
Islam Makhachev
Izabela Badurek
Jared Cannonier
Jason Knight
Jimmie Rivera
Joaquim Silva
Jocelyn Jones-Lybarger
Joe Merritt
Jonathan Wilson
Jonavin Webb
Joseph Duffy
Julian Erosa
Kamaru Usman
Karolina Kowalkiewicz
Konstantin Erokhin
Leo Kuntz
Levan Makashvili
Lewis Gonzalez
Łukasz Sajewski
Luis Henrique
Magomed Mustafaev
Makwan Amirkhani
Polo Reyes
Marcin Wrzosek
Marion Reneau
Maryna Moroz

Masio Fullen
Matheus Nicolau
Michael Graves
Mickael Lebout
Misha Cirkunov
Nazareno Malegarie
Nicolas Dalby
Oluwale Bamgbose
Paul Redmond
Reginaldo Vieira
Rocky Lee
Roger Zapata
Ron Stallings
Ryan Hall
Sage Northcutt
Scott Holtzman
Shamil Abdurakhimov
Sirwan Kakai
Shane Campbell
Steve Bossé
Steve Kennedy
Steve Montgomery
Stevie Ray
Sultan Aliev
Taylor Lapilus
Teemu Packalen
Teruto Ishihara
Timothy Johnson
Tom Breese
Tony Sims
Valentina Shevchenko
Vernon Ramos
Vicente Luque
Yusuke Kasuya

Events list

See also
 UFC
 List of UFC champions
 List of UFC events

References

External links
 UFC past events on UFC.com
 UFC events results at Sherdog.com
 UFC Upcoming events and Past event results at Boldtiger.com

Ultimate Fighting Championship by year
2015 in mixed martial arts